The House at 30 Sheffield Road is one of the more creative early 20th century Craftsman style houses in Wakefield, Massachusetts.  The -story house was built (c. 1916) predominantly of fieldstone and finished in stucco, and was one of the first houses built in the Sheffield Road subdivision.  The main body of the house as a gable roof, with two cross-gable sections facing front sheltering porches set on heavy columns.  The entry is in the center of the front facade, topped by a small gable end, and with a small pergola in front.

The house was listed on the National Register of Historic Places in 1989.

See also
National Register of Historic Places listings in Wakefield, Massachusetts
National Register of Historic Places listings in Middlesex County, Massachusetts

References

Houses on the National Register of Historic Places in Wakefield, Massachusetts
Houses completed in 1917
Houses in Wakefield, Massachusetts